Fatty's Flirtation is a 1913 American short comedy film featuring Roscoe 'Fatty' Arbuckle and Mabel Normand.

Cast
 Roscoe Arbuckle as Fatty
 Mabel Normand as Mabel
 Minta Durfee as Minta
 William Hauber in unidentified role
 Hank Mann as Cop (uncredited)
 Ford Sterling as Cop (uncredited)

See also
 Fatty Arbuckle filmography

References

External links

1913 films
Silent American comedy films
1913 comedy films
1913 short films
American silent short films
American black-and-white films
Films directed by George Nichols
American comedy short films
1910s American films
1910s English-language films